Baiyun Stadium (Simplified Chinese: 白云体育场) is a multi-use stadium in Baiyun District, Guiyang, China.  It is currently used mostly for football matches.  The stadium holds 12,000 people.

Footnotes

Football venues in China
Sports venues in Guizhou